P. pinnata may refer to:
 Paullinia pinnata, a flowering plant species found in Africa
 Pometia pinnata, a tree species widespread in south east Asia and the Pacific region
 Psoralea pinnata, a small tree species native of South Africa
 Puck pinnata, a fish species known only from the northwest Pacific